The Barras is a major street and indoor weekend market in the East End of Glasgow, Scotland. The term "Barra" is Glaswegian dialect for "barrow" relating to the market's early years where traders sold their wares from handcarts. Barrowland is sometimes used to describe the Calton district of Glasgow, where the market is located.

History 

One of Glasgow's most famous institutions, The Barras was founded by James and Margaret McIver in the interwar years. Several of the smaller 1921-era market halls still bear the McIver name, although the main Barrowland Ballroom building was rebuilt after a fire in 1958, reopening in 1960. The ballroom has become a world-famous musical venue. There was a 'barra's queen.'

The original building opened in 1934 in a mercantile area east of Glasgow's city centre. The Barrowland building includes large street-level halls used for the weekend markets, with a sizeable weatherproof dance hall above. The front of the building is decorated with a distinctive animated neon sign.

In 2016, with market stalls quieter than in previous decades, the city council looked at proposals to redevelop the area.

Location 

Because of its location on Gallowgate – the main thoroughfare from the city centre to Parkhead and Celtic Park, The Barrowland has a large concentration of public houses and shops devoted to fans of Celtic Football Club.

Gallery

References

External links 
 
 The Barras Market

Culture in Glasgow
Economy of Glasgow
Retail markets in the United Kingdom
Bridgeton–Calton–Dalmarnock